Jim Breen was an Australian rugby league footballer who played in the 1920s. He played for South Sydney in the NSWRL competition during the club's first golden era where Souths won 7 premierships in 8 seasons.

Background
Breen was born in Mascot, New South Wales, Australia and played his junior rugby league for Mascot before being signed by Souths.

Playing career
Breen made his first grade debut for South Sydney against University in Round 8 1924 at the Sydney Cricket Ground.

In 1928, Breen captained Souths in the 1928 NSWRL grand final against arch rivals Eastern Suburbs which was played at the Royal Agricultural Society Grounds.  Souths would win the match in convincing fashion by a score of 26-5 claiming their 4th premiership in a row.

The 1928 NSWRL grand final would be Breen's last game in the top grade.  Overall, Breen played a total of 113 matches across all grades for Souths scoring 46 tries and kicking 23 goals.  Breen retired at the end of the 1930 season.

References

South Sydney Rabbitohs players
Year of birth missing
Year of death missing
Place of death missing
Rugby league halfbacks
Rugby league five-eighths